Dastgerd (also Romanized as Dastgird; also known as Dastjirdūn) is a village in Tabas-e Masina Rural District of Gazik District, Darmian County, South Khorasan province, Iran. At the 2006 National Census, its population was 1,179 in 262 households. The following census in 2011 counted 1,149 people in 298 households. The latest census in 2016 showed a population of 1,262 people in 332 households; it was the largest village in its rural district.

References 

Darmian County

Populated places in South Khorasan Province

Populated places in Darmian County